Palani Elilan Mylvaganam Udayakumar (born 28 September 1967) is a Sri Lankan politician, former provincial councillor and Member of Parliament.

Udayakumar was born on 28 September 1967. He has a degree in management. He was previously deputy leader of the Ceylon Workers' Congress but is currently a member of the National Union of Workers.

Udayakumar was a member of the Central Provincial Council. He contested the 2020 parliamentary election as a Samagi Jana Balawegaya electoral alliance candidate in Nuwara Eliya District and was elected to the Parliament of Sri Lanka.

References

1967 births
Ceylon Workers' Congress politicians
Indian Tamil politicians of Sri Lanka
Living people
Members of the 16th Parliament of Sri Lanka
Members of the Central Provincial Council
Samagi Jana Balawegaya politicians
Sri Lankan Hindus
United People's Freedom Alliance politicians